is a 2018 Japanese anime television series about a fictional idol unit, produced by Studio Deen. It spawned from a short film that was produced by Studio Deen for Young Animator Training Project's Anime Mirai 2015. The 12-episode series aired between July 6 and September 21, 2018. A single titled "On Stage Life" was released on June 6, 2018, under the fictional group's name.

Plot
Eccentric girl Hanako Yamadagi returns to Japan from the United States and finds herself enamored by the Music Girls, an obscure eleven member idol unit she discovered performing at the airport. The Music Girls' manager, Ikehashi, takes a shot on Hanako during open auditions hoping that a new member would help revitalize the band. Unfortunately for Ikehashi, while Hanako is good at dancing, she's not good at singing. Instead, Hanako becomes the secretary for the Music Girls, helping them solve various problems behind the scenes.

Characters

Anime
The 12-episode anime television series aired between July 6 and September 21, 2018. The series is simulcasted by Crunchyroll. Digital Media Rights' AsianCrush streaming website also simulcasted the series. After the final episode, the series is available on Tubi and Amazon Prime's streaming service and for download on Amazon's website.

Notes

References

External links
 

2010s animated short films
Anime short films
Anime with original screenplays
AT-X (TV network) original programming
Japanese idols in anime and manga
2010s Japanese-language films
Music in anime and manga
Studio Deen